Walt Disney and the 1964 World's Fair is a 2009 five-CD box set compiling music and audio from Disney's attractions at the 1964 New York World's Fair: 
 General Electric's Progressland, featuring the Carousel of Progress
 Great Moments with Mr. Lincoln, presented by the State of Illinois
 "it's a small world", presented by Pepsi
 Ford's Magic Skyway

The set includes a 24-page booklet about the 1964 World's Fair researched and written by Stacia Martin, laid out by Bruce Gordon.

Critical reception

J. Scott McClintock of AllMusic gave the set four out of five stars, commenting, "the recordings, along with the lavishly illustrated 24-page booklet, paint an inspiring picture of the creativity and knack for innovation that the Disney 'imagineers' brought to these beloved attractions."

Film critic and historian Leonard Maltin called the set "impressive" and "a treat for Disneyphiles everywhere," also noting, "[t]he audio quality is astonishing, from start to finish: you’d swear you were in the room with the actors and musicians.

Track listing

Disc one: Progressland
"There's a Great Big Beautiful Tomorrow" music and lyrics by Richard M. Sherman and Robert B. Sherman

 There's a Great Big Beautiful Tomorrow - 4:44
 Instrumental entrance and exit version
 Welcome - 0:20
 Excerpt from recording session with Rex Allen
 Walt Disney and the Sherman Brothers - 2:33
 Excerpt from film produced for General Electric
 Carousel of Progress (Early Script Reading) - 3:07
 Featuring Imagineers James Algar, Marty Sklar, and John Hench
 Carousel of Progress - 19:29
 The Skydome Spectacular - 7:59
 The Toucan and Parrot Electric Utility Show - 8:46
 Voices of Paul Frees, Wally Boag, and Dick Wesson
 Music to Buy Toasters By (Medallion City) - 10:02
 Instrumental bossa nova version of "There's a Great Big Beautiful Tomorrow"
 Mirror Maze - 5:09
There's a Great Big Beautiful Tomorrow
(isolated instrumental pieces from the final show)
 Kaleidophonic° Overture - 3:18
 1890s Variation - 0:46
 Dixieland Variation - 1:46
 1920s Variation - 0:46
 1930s Variation - 0:48
 Swing Variation - 1:05
 1960s Variation - 0:48
 Horizons Variation (Epcot) - 1:09
 Version from Epcot's Horizons pavilion

Bonus disc
 Carousel of Progress (Alternate Universe Version) - 27:10
 A fully scored, full-length version of Carousel of Progress with an alternate script

Disc two: Great Moments with Mr. Lincoln
 Walt Disney introduction - :58
 Promotional message by Walt Disney
 Pre-show: The Illinois Story - 6:02
 Main show: Great Moments with Mr. Lincoln - 9:11
 Voice of Royal Dano as Abraham Lincoln
 Pre-show score - 10:18
 Main show score - 8:13
 Scores by Buddy Baker
 Dialog recording session - 5:33
 With show writer James Algar and Royal Dano
 Chorus - 1:37
 Finale: "The Battle Hymn of the Republic"

Disc three: "It's a Small World"
"It's a Small World" music and lyrics by Richard M. Sherman and Robert B. Sherman
 Queue/entrance music - 3:07
 Arranged by Bobby Hammack
 First demo recording - 1:06
 Walt Disney welcome - 9:16
 Vocals (isolated) - 2:16
 The Ultimate MegaMix - 20:56
 Every segment, presented in order of recording
 Exit music - 2:40
 Disneyland Paris variation I - 2:07
 Disneyland Paris variation II - 1:29
 Disneyland Paris variations arranged by John Debney
 Chorus - :24
 "it's a small world" - 21:21
 The final version of the attraction

Disc four: Magic Skyway
 World of Tomorrow - 3:01
 Composed by George Bruns
 The Magic Skyway - 10:55
 Narrated by Walt Disney
International Gardens
 Pavilion atmosphere music
 The South American Way - 2:47
 Flubber Waltz (alt. NYWF title: Viennese) - 4:41
 Originally composed by George Bruns for the film The Absent-Minded Professor
 Serengeti Serenade - 4:05
 Later used in the opening titles for The Jungle Book
 Moonlight Time in Old Hawaii - 3:04
 Nation on Wheels - 1:44 
 Originally composed by George Bruns for the television episode "Magic Highway U.S.A."
 Flyin' Ford - 2:56
 Originally composed by George Bruns for the film The Absent-Minded Professor
 La Gaviota [The Seagull] - 3:13
 Originally composed by George Bruns for Zorro TV series
 Disneyland° - 3:09
 Originally composed by George Bruns with lyrics by Larry Morey for the Disneyland TV series
 Auto Parts Harmonic - 8:58
 Dialog recording session - 8:28
 Walt Disney's recording session
 Get the Feel of the Wheel (Ford March) - 6:13
 Composed by Richard M. Sherman and Robert B. Sherman

(° Written erroneously in booklet CD track listing, corrected here.)

References

External links
 
 Information at Walt Disney Records website (archived version)

2009 compilation albums
Walt Disney Records compilation albums
World's fair music
1964 New York World's Fair
2009 soundtrack albums
Walt Disney Records soundtracks